This list of mammals of Nevada includes mammal species living in the U.S. state of Nevada. It also includes species that are now extirpated from the state.

Order: Eulipotyphla

Shrews
Family: Soricidae
 Desert shrew (Notiosorex crawford)
 Merriam's shrew (Sorex merriami)	 
 Montane shrew (Sorex monticolus)
 American water shrew (Sorex palustris)	
 Preble's shrew (Sorex preblei)
 Inyo shrew (Sorex tenellus)	
 Trowbridge's shrew (Sorex trowbridgii)	 
 Vagrant shrew (Sorex vagrans)

Moles
Family: Talpidae
 Broad-footed mole, (Scapanus latimanus)

Order: Chiroptera (bats)

Vesper bats
Family: Vespertilionidae
 Hoary bat (Aeorestes cinereus)
 Pallid bat (Antrozous pallidus)
 Townsend's big-eared bat (Corynorhinus townsendii)
 Big brown bat (Eptesicus fuscus)
 Spotted bat (Euderma maculatum)
 Allen's big-eared bat (Idionycteris phyllotis)
 Silver-haired bat (Lasionycteris noctivagans)
 Western red bat (Lasiurus blossevillii)
 Western yellow bat (Lasiurus xanthinus)
 Southwestern myotis (Myotis auriculus)
 California myotis (Myotis californicus)
 Western small-footed myotis (Myotis ciliolabrum)
 Long-eared myotis (Myotis evotis)
 Little brown bat (Myotis lucifugus)
 Fringed myotis (Myotis thysanodes)
 Long-legged myotis (Myotis yumanensis)
 Western pipistrelle (Pipistrellus hesperus)

Free-tailed batsFamily: Molossidae
 Western mastiff bat (Eumops perotis)
 Mexican free-tailed bat (Tadarida brasiliensis) 

Leaf-nosed batsFamily: Phyllostomidae
 Mexican long-tongued bat (Choeronycteris mexicana) 
 California leaf-nosed bat (Macrotus californicus)

Order: Lagomorpha (lagomorphs)
Rabbits and haresFamily': Leporidae
 Pygmy rabbit (Brachylagus idahoensis)
 Snowshoe hare (Lepus americanus)
 Black-tailed jackrabbit (Lepus californicus)
 White-tailed jackrabbit (Lepus townsendii)
 Audubon's cottontail (Sylvilagus audobonii)
 Mountain cottontail (Sylvilagus nuttallii)

Pikas
Family: Ochotonidae
 American pika (Ochotona princeps)

Order: Rodentia (rodents)

Squirrels
Family: Sciuridae
 White-tailed antelope squirrel (Ammospermophilus leucurus)
 Northern flying squirrel (Gluacomys sabrinus)
 Yellow-bellied marmot (Marmota flaviventris)
 Alpine chipmunk (Neotamias alpinus)
 Yellow-pine chipmunk (Neotamias amoenus)
 Cliff chipmunk (Neotamias dorsalis)
 Merriam's chipmunk (Neotamias merriami)
 Least chipmunk (Neotamias minimus)
 Yellow-cheeked chipmunk (Neotamias ochrogenys) 
 Panamint chipmunk (Neotamias panamintinus)
 Long-eared chipmunk (Neotamias quadrimaculatus)
 Allen's chipmunk (Neotamias senex)
 Siskiyou chipmunk (Neotamias siskiyou)
 Sonoma chipmunk (Neotamias sonomae)
 Lodgepole chipmunk (Neotamias speciosus)
 Uinta chipmunk (Neotamias umbrinus)
 Western gray squirrel (Sciurus griseus)
 California ground squirrel (Spermophilus beecheyi)
 Belding's ground squirrel (Spermophilus beldingi)
 Golden-mantled ground squirrel (Spermophilus lateralis)
 Mohave ground squirrel (Spermophilus mohavensis)
 Round-tailed ground squirrel (Spermophilus tereticaudus)
 Townsend's ground squirrel (Spermophilus townsendii)
 Rock squirrel (Spermophilus variegatus)
 Douglas squirrel	(Tamiasciurus douglasii)
 Merriam's ground squirrel (Urocitellus canus)

Mountain beavers
Family: Aplodontiidae
 Mountain beaver (Aplodontia rufa)

Pocket gophers
Family: Geomyidae
 Botta's pocket gopher (Thomomys bottae) possibly extirpated
 Mountain pocket gopher (Thomomys monticola)
 Northern pocket gopher (Thomomys talpoides) 	 	 	 	 	 
 Townsend's pocket gopher (Thomomys townsendii)

Kangaroo rats and pocket mice
Family: Heteromyidae	
 Long-tailed pocket mouse (Chaetodipus formosus)		 	 	 
 Desert pocket mouse (Chaetodipus penicillatus)	 	 
 Spiny pocket mouse (Chaetodipus spinatus) 	
 Merriam's kangaroo rat (Dipodomys merriami)
 Chisel-toothed kangaroo rat (Dipodomys microps)
 Ord's kangaroo rat (Dipodomys ordii)	 
 Panamint kangaroo rat (Dipodomys panamintinus)
 Dark kangaroo mouse (Microdipodops megacephalus)
 Pale kangaroo mouse (Microdipodops pallidus)
 Little pocket mouse (Perognathus longimembris)	 		 	 	 
 Great Basin pocket mouse (Perognathus parvus)

Beavers
Family: Castoridae
 North American beaver (Castor canadensis)

Jumping mice
Family: Dipodidae
 Western jumping mouse (Zapus princeps)

New World mice, rats, and voles
Family: Cricetidae
 Sagebrush vole (Lemmiscus curtatus)
 Long-tailed vole (Microtus longicaudus)
 Montane vole (Microtus montanus)
 Bushy-tailed woodrat (Neotoma cinerea)
 Desert woodrat (Neotoma lepida) 	 
 Muskrat (Ondatra zibethicus)
 Northern grasshopper mouse (Onychomys leucogaster)	 
 Southern grasshopper mouse (Onychomys torridus)	
 Brush mouse (Peromyscus boylii)
 Canyon mouse (Peromyscus crinitus)	 	 
 Cactus mouse (Peromyscus eremicus) 
Gambel's deer mouse, (Peromyscus gambelii)
 Western deer mouse, (Peromyscus sonoriensis)
 Pinyon mouse (Peromyscus truei)	 
 Western harvest mouse (Reithrodontomys megalotus) 	
 Arizona cotton rat (Sigmodon arizonae) extirpated

Old World mice and rats
Family: Muridae
 House mouse (Mus musculus) introduced
 Brown rat (Rattus norvegicus) introduced
 Black rat (Rattus rattus) introduced

Porcupines
Family: Erethizontidae
 North American porcupine (Erethizon dorsatum)

Order: Carnivora (carnivorans)

Canids
Family: Canidae
 Coyote  (Canis latrans)
 Gray wolf (Canis lupus) extirpated, vagrant 
Cascade Mountains wolf (C. l. fuscus) extinct
Northwestern wolf (C. l .occidentalis) vagrant
Southern Rocky Mountain wolf (C. l. youngi) extinct
 Gray fox (Urocyon cinereoargenteus)
 Kit fox (Vulpes macrotis)
 Red fox (Vulpes vulpes)
 Sierra Nevada red fox (V. v. necator)

Bears
Family: Ursidae
 American black bear (Ursus americanus) 
 Brown bear (Ursus arctos) extirpated
 Grizzly bear (U. a. horribilis) extirpated

Procyonids
Family: Procyonidae
 Ringtail (Bassariscus astutus)
 Raccoon (Procyon lotor)

Mustelids
Family: Mustelidae
 Wolverine (Gulo gulo) extirpated
 North American river otter (Lontra canadensis)
 Pacific marten (Martes caurina) 
 American ermine (Mustela richardsonii) 
 Long-tailed weasel (Neogale frenata)
 American mink (Neogale vison)
 American badger (Taxidea taxus)

Skunks
Family: Mephitidae
 Striped skunk (Mephitis mephitis)
 Western spotted skunk (Spilogale gracilis)

Cats
Family: Felidae
 Canada lynx (Lynx canadensis) extirpated
 Bobcat (Lynx rufus) 
 Cougar (Puma concolor)

Order: Artiodactyla (even-toed ungulates)

Deer
Family: Cervidae
 Moose (Alces alces)
 Elk (Cervus canadensis) 
Rocky Mountain elk (C. c. nelsoni)
 Mule deer  (Odocoileus hemionus)
 White-tailed deer  (Odocoileus virginianus)

Bovids
Family: Bovidae
 American bison (Bison bison) extirpated
 Mountain goat (Oreamnos americanus) introduced
 Bighorn sheep (Ovis canadensis)
Desert bighorn (O. c. nelsoni)

Pronghorns
Family: Antilocapridae
 Pronghorn (Antilocapra americana)

See also
 Lists of mammals by region
 List of U.S. state mammals

References

Nevada
Mammals